National Alliance may refer to:

Electoral alliances
National Alliance (Egypt)
National Alliance (Pakistan)
Nation Alliance (Turkey)

Political parties and organizations
Anguilla National Alliance
National Alliance (Australia) 
National Alliance (Greece)
National Alliance (Italy)
National Alliance (Latvia)
National Alliance (Lithuania)
National Alliance (Malaysia)
National Alliance (Netherlands)
National Alliance (Norway)
National Alliance of Democratic Forces
National Alliance of Russian Solidarists
National Alliance (Peru)
National Alliance (Portugal)
National Alliance (Saint Lucia)
National Alliance (Sint Maarten)
National Alliance (South Africa)
National Alliance (Spain)
National Alliance (Sweden)
National Alliance (United States)
National Alliance (Uruguay)
National Alliance July 18
National Alliance Party (Papua New Guinea)
National Alliance Party of Fiji
National Alliance Party of Kenya
Nationalist Alliance
San Marinese National Alliance
Somali National Alliance

Publications
 National Alliance (newspaper), a newspaper of the Farmers' Alliance